Katherine Joan Balfour Dickson (21 December 1921 – 9 October 1994) was a Scottish cellist and cello teacher.

Biography 
Dickson was born in Edinburgh, Scotland on 21 December 1921 to Marjorie Balfour Lowe and Dr Douglas Dickson, a lawyer and Writer to the Signet.

She worked primarily in the United Kingdom, and was a professor at the Royal College of Music in London. She was also a notable performer, giving many duo recitals with her longtime partner Joyce Rathbone. Joan also collaborated regularly with her sister Hester, who was also a pianist, and a piano accompaniment lecturer at the Royal Conservatoire of Scotland until 2014.

She studied with Enrico Mainardi in Paris.

Her students included Moray Welsh, Ian Hampton, Melissa Phelps, Alexander Baillie, Richard Harwood, Andrew Shulman, Ruth Beauchamp and Louisa Tuck.

She died in London on 9 October 1994.

References

Literature 
 Margaret Campbell: "Joan Dickson". In: Grove Music Online. Oxford Music Online. 22. August 2012.

External links 
 "Obituary:Joan Dickson" The Independent 1994

Scottish cellists
Scottish music educators
1921 births
1994 deaths
20th-century Scottish musicians
20th-century Scottish educators
Women cellists
20th-century classical musicians
20th-century cellists